Halo is a superheroine appearing in comic books published by DC Comics. She first appeared in a special insert in The Brave and the Bold #200 (July 1983) and was created by Mike W. Barr and Jim Aparo.

The character's origin involves spirit possession. An alien being took over the body of a recently murdered woman and resurrected her. Halo initially suffered from amnesia, having no access to the memories of either the alien or the human host.

Publication history
Halo first appeared in The Brave and the Bold #200 and was created by Mike W. Barr and Jim Aparo.

Fictional character biography
Halo is a gestalt of a human woman named Violet Harper and an Aurakle, an ancient energy-being resembling a sphere of iridescent light. The Aurakle species emerged from the Source billions of years ago at the dawn of time. When sociopath Violet Harper was murdered by Syonide, an operative of the 100 and Tobias Whale, the Aurakle, who had been observing her out of curiosity, was sucked into the newly vacant body, reanimating the deceased body. The shock of the death and resurrection induced a profound loss of memory in the new combined entity. She was subsequently found and recruited by Batman to serve as a member of the Outsiders. In one early incident, Halo gains access to the memories of the long-lived Aurakle and becomes emotional over the tendency of human beings to kill each other. Halo later has to deal with the consequences of her body's previous actions, which required the assistance of the Outsiders team to resolve.

The young Halo is initially the legal ward of her friend and Outsiders teammate Katana. During her stint in the Outsiders, she gains a friend in new member Windfall.

Death
Halo did die, in a manner of speaking, in a much later incident. After the team was framed for the murder of Markovia's queen, which was caused by Roderick and his vampire forces, they were forced to flee. Technocrat's evil ex-wife, Marissa Barron, hires an old associate named Ryer who believes Technocrat had abandoned him in Markovia. As the cyborg Sanction, he nearly kills the Outsiders in Switzerland. Later, in Gotham City, he attacks again, slaying both Marissa and Halo. As with Violet Harper, Halo's essence is sucked into Marissa's body, reanimating it.

During an attempt by the Outsiders to create a new headquarters, other Aurakles would return to reclaim Halo. Halo would later strike up a relationship with Sebastian Faust, a fellow Outsider that not many on the team trusted. The entire team is eventually cleared of wrongdoing. Halo later returns to Markovia. There she assists in combating a portal to Hell that had opened as part of the Day of Judgment incident.

Further adventures
Halo later appears back in the body of its original host, Violet Harper, through unexplained means.

During the Infinite Crisis, supervillain prisons around the world are opened as their respective wardens are targeted and blackmailed. Halo is part of a makeshift team of heroes battling a breakout at the Alcatraz prison in San Francisco. She later joins the Battle of Metropolis, which takes place in issue #7, helping other heroes protect the city from an army of super-villains bent on its destruction.

Soon after the events of the crisis, she assists a team of astronauts in a space station searching for heroes missing in action. She detects traces of Zeta radiation, a sign of Adam Strange, one of the many missing.

She is part of another multi-hero battle, this time against the murderous Black Adam. This takes place on Chinese soil, during the limited series World War III.

She makes another brief appearance in Action Comics #843. She is part of dozens of super-powered beings fighting to free themselves from the prison ships of the "Auctioneer".

In Batman and the Outsiders Special (Feb. 2009), Halo is one of the heroes approached by Alfred to form a new team of Outsiders. She accepts in Outsiders vol. 4, #15 and reforms the team with original members Katana, Geo-Force, Black Lightning, and Metamorpho, along with new members Owlman and the Creeper.

Blackest Night
During a recovery mission with the Outsiders, Halo, along with the Creeper and Katana, are confronted by Katana's recently resurrected family. Under the control of their Black Lantern rings, they attack Katana and Halo, with Creeper easily dispatched; he retreats into the woods to get help from their prisoner, Killer Croc. While Katana battles her husband, Halo is forced to fight Katana's children. Although her light-based powers prove ineffective at first, Violet unleashes more power than ever before to save her teammates, whose abilities have no long-term effect on the Lanterns. Finally, she manages to destroy the Black Lantern rings and goes to aid the rest of her team who are also under attack.

Back in their headquarters, the rest of the Outsiders are faced with a recently risen Terra and are hopelessly outmatched until Halo intervenes. With great effort, she manages to separate Terra from her ring and to destroy it while Geo-Force turns Terra's body to stone to keep her from coming back again. Violet, however, seems to disperse into light, her last words being that the (light) is calling her. Afterward, Halo is returned to Earth.

Batman Incorporated
Halo is later selected as a member of a new team of Outsiders, led by Red Robin and funded by Batman Incorporated. Halo and her teammates infiltrate a satellite said to be run by the villainous Leviathan organization, but this is revealed to be a trap set by Lord Death Man and Talia al Ghul. The satellite is destroyed in a massive explosion, making it unclear whether Halo and the others survived.

In The New 52 reboot of DC's continuity, Halo and the Outsiders survived the explosion but were assumed dead. They now work as part of the Dead Heroes Club, a group of heroes who take advantage of their legally-deceased status to perform covert missions for Batman.

In a later series, Halo is once again shown as very naive, freshly rescued from an incident in Markovia. She is under the care of Katana. The government believes Halo simply to be a young girl, unaware of her alien origin and powers.

Powers and abilities
Halo has the ability to fly and to create auras of the seven known rainbow colors around herself, called halos, which have different effects:

 Violet: Self-healing abilities and resurrection, and can produce empowering mental effects that can give her previous body's consciousness control of their shared body.
 Indigo:  Tractor beam.
 Blue:  Duplicate herself and objects into several holographic copies.
 Green: Produce halting stasis beams to stop and manipulate enemies.
 Yellow: Rays of yellow light from hands that can stun or blind enemies.
 Orange: Concussive blasts.
 Red: Create a strong energy shield, Levitation and produce destructive heat beams to melt or burn enemies.
 White: Emit a blinding white light that is strong enough to overcome shadows and dark energies. 

The halos provide a measure of defense against similar effects directed against her. For instance, her green stasis halo protected her from being immobilized by the Cryonic Man's freezing gas, and her orange concussive halo can repel physical attacks.

Halo can alternate between her costume and civilian clothes instantly. This transition is accompanied by an aura of primarily black color with white blotches of light.

The negation of the color spectrum will negate Halo's powers; the DC universe has many villains with just such abilities.

In the 1990s, it was shown that should her human body be destroyed, the Aurakle can merge with another recently deceased human.

During the Blackest Night, Violet's powers proved highly effective, allowing her to destroy Black Lanterns and their rings, a feat usually reserved only for the wielders of the various Lantern Corps and the users of the Dove power.

Other versions
The Elseworlds series JLA: Another Nail contains an alternate Halo, as a black woman; her real name and background are unrevealed.

In other media

Television
 Halo appears in the teaser for the Batman: The Brave and the Bold episode "Requiem for a Scarlet Speedster!" as a member of the Outsiders.
 Halo appears in Young Justice, voiced by Zehra Fazal. Introduced in the third season, Outsiders, this version is the product of a dissected Mother Box's spirit reviving the body of Gabrielle Daou, a Quraci refugee who was kidnapped by metahuman traffickers, used as a test subject to stimulate her "meta-gene", and euthanized by Helga Jace when she tested negative for the gene. Upon her awakening, they woke up a "blank slate", with minor traces of Daou's personality and memories as well as fleeting access to the Mother Box's knowledge and some of its powers. They are soon after rescued by Tigress, who nicknames them "Halo" and whom they would go on to live with before joining Nightwing's team, who helps them figure out who and what they are and the vast range of abilities they have. They also name themselves "Violet Harper", seeing themselves as a new individual, enters a relationship with Brion Markov, and befriends Harper Row. However, Jace takes advantage of Halo's amnesia by claiming that they are dying from overusing their violet aura before Halo is kidnapped by Granny Goodness, who discovers they can access the Source with none of the safeguards that Metron incorporated into Mother and Father Boxes. Halo is placed under mind control and forced to create the Anti-Life Equation to place the universe under Darkseid's control, but Victor Stone rescues Halo, allowing them to save the universe. In the aftermath, Halo breaks up with Markov after Zviad Baazovi secretly manipulates him into killing his uncle Baron Bedlam. In the fourth season, Young Justice: Phantoms, Halo considers converting to Islam as Daou's faith was important to her, starts identifying as non-binary, and begins to reconsider their feelings towards Markov and Row. As of the fourth season finale, Violet and Row have entered a relationship. This version of Halo's abilities are as follows:
Violet: Healing and passive self-resurrection.
Indigo: Boom-tube generation.
Blue: A blindingly bright light.
Green: Holograms.
Yellow: Concussive energy blasts that can also slice through objects if fired in a cutting motion.
Orange: Flight.
Red: Force field generation.
Rainbow: All available powers plus Anti-Life Equation healing.

Film
An alternate universe version of Halo called Aurora appears in Justice League: Crisis on Two Earths as a minor member of the Crime Syndicate of America whose powers function similarly to a Green Lantern's.

References

External links
DCU Guide: Halo
DCU Guide: Halo Chronology
Outsiders Chronology Project: Volume Five

Fictional extraterrestrial–human hybrids in comics
Comics characters introduced in 1983
Characters created by Mike W. Barr
Characters created by Jim Aparo
DC Comics extraterrestrial superheroes
DC Comics female superheroes
DC Comics LGBT superheroes
DC Comics characters with accelerated healing
DC Comics metahumans
Fictional characters with spirit possession or body swapping abilities
Fiction about resurrection
Fictional characters with amnesia